Ernest Jean-Marie Millard de Bois Durand (29 July 1872 – 18 January 1946) was a painter, watercolorist and illustrator born in Paris. He was a professor of drawing and artistic anatomy at the École Boulle.

Illustrated books 

 Les Trophées (J.-M. de Hérédia) single copy
 Cyrano de Bergerac (Rostand Ed)
 Cléopâtre (H. Houssaye)

Lithographs 

 Marguerite d'York
 Sphynx

Main table 

 La Bièvre aux Gobelins
 Le marché de Laruns
 Vallée bretonne
 Interieur Limousin
 Saint Sébastien
 La sorcière
 La femme au sofa

Watercolors 

 Le Monte Generoso
 Les sapins de Stockholm
 Foire de Fribourg
 Bords de la Sarthe
 Les gorges du Guiel sous Montdauphin
 Les gorges d'Ailefroide près de Vallouise (Hautes Alpes)
 Le Hameau d'Ailefroide (Hautes Alpes)
 Le marché sous les remparts de Fougères  (Iles et Vilaine)
 Fougères, le marché sur la Place Lariboisière (gift of the artist, Hôtel de ville de Fougères)
 La chaumière limousine
 Autoportrait (collection of the family Millard de Bois Durand)
 Palada, Pyrénées-Orientales vue du pont du chemin de fer (collection of the family Millard de Bois Durand)
 Cancale, le Port de la houle
 Le retour du troupeau
 Village en montagne (Hautes Alpes)

See also 
 Full article: Ernest Millard 

19th-century French painters
French male painters
20th-century French painters
20th-century French male artists
Post-impressionist painters
1872 births
1946 deaths
19th-century French male artists